Janner Hitcler Corozo Alman (born 8 September 1995) is an Ecuadorian footballer who plays mainly as a right winger for Ecuadorian club Barcelona S.C. on loan from Pachuca and the Ecuador national team.

Club career

Early career
Born in Guayaquil, Corozo made his senior debut with CD Juvenil Carlos Borbor Reyes in the 2012 Segunda Categoría de Santa Elena, also featuring in the national competition with the side. For the 2013, he moved to hometown side LDU Guayaquil.

In February 2014, Corozo signed for Macará and was initially assigned to the under-18 side before making his first team debut during the year's Serie B. In September 2014, he moved abroad after joining the under-20 team of Mexican side Atlas, on loan.

Upon returning to Macará in January 2015, Corozo became a regular starter in the main squad, scoring five goals in 33 appearances. He moved on loan to Serie A side El Nacional in January 2016, and made his top tier debut on 7 February of that year by coming on as a second-half substitute in a 2–1 home win over Barcelona SC.

Corozo scored his first goal in the top tier of Ecuadorian football on 17 July 2016, netting the equalizer in a 3–3 home draw against Deportivo Cuenca.

Independiente del Valle
On 1 January 2017, Corozo signed for Independiente del Valle, also in the top tier. In July, however, he suffered a knee injury which kept him out for the remainder of the season.

After being mainly used as a substitute during the 2018 campaign, Corozo returned to previous club Macará on 20 December 2018, on a one-year loan deal.

Delfín
On 2 January 2020, Delfín announced the signing of Corozo. He immediately became a starter for his new side, being subsequently linked to Emelec, LDU Quito and Barcelona in 2021.

Everton (loan)
On second half 2022, Corozo joined Grupo Pachuca and was immediately loaned to Everton de Viña del Mar in the Chilean Primera División.

International career
On 23 October 2021, Corozo was called up to the Ecuador national team by manager Gustavo Alfaro for a friendly against Mexico. He made his full international debut four days later, starting and scoring his side's second in the 3–2 win at the Bank of America Stadium in Charlotte, North Carolina.

Career statistics

Club

International

International goals
Scores and results list Ecuador's goal tally first.

References

External links
 

1995 births
Living people
Sportspeople from Guayaquil
Ecuadorian footballers
Ecuadorian expatriate footballers
Ecuador international footballers
Association football wingers
Ecuadorian Serie A players
Ecuadorian Serie B players
C.S.D. Macará footballers
C.D. El Nacional footballers
C.S.D. Independiente del Valle footballers
Delfín S.C. footballers
C.F. Pachuca players
Chilean Primera División players
Everton de Viña del Mar footballers
Expatriate footballers in Mexico
Ecuadorian expatriate sportspeople in Mexico
Expatriate footballers in Chile
Ecuadorian expatriate sportspeople in Chile